Praia de Ponta Figo is a subdivision in the western part of the town of Neves in the Lembá District in the northwestern part of São Tomé Island in São Tomé and Príncipe. Its population is 247 (2012 census).

Population history

References

Populated places in Lembá District
Populated coastal places in São Tomé and Príncipe